Simplicicordia is a genus of small carnivorous bivalves in the family Verticordiidae. It contains the single species S. trigonata.

References 

Verticordiidae
Monotypic mollusc genera
Molluscs described in 1922
Bivalve genera